Pre-vocational secondary education (abbr. VMBO) is a school track in the Netherlands. It lasts four years, from the age of twelve to sixteen. It combines vocational training with theoretical education in languages, mathematics, history, arts, and sciences. Sixty percent of students nationally are enrolled in VMBO. VMBO has five different levels; in each a different mix of practical vocational training and theoretical education is combined:

Theoretical programme (VMBO-T) is the most theoretical of the four. It prepares for middle management and  vocational training at the  level of secondary education and it is needed to enter  (HAVO). It is also known as MAVO.
Combined programme is in between the theoretical and middle-management-oriented paths.
Middle-management vocational programme teaches theoretical education and vocational training equally. It prepares for middle management and vocational training at the MBO level of secondary education.
Basic vocational programme emphasizes vocational training and prepares for the vocational training at the MBO level of secondary education.
Practical education consists out of mainly vocational training. It is meant for pupils who would otherwise not obtain their VMBO diplomas. After obtaining this diploma pupils can enter the job market without further training.

For all of these levels there is "learning path supporting education", which is intended for pupils with educational or behavioural problems. These pupils are taught in small classes by specialised teachers.

See also 
Education in the Netherlands

References

Dutch words and phrases
Education in the Netherlands